The following is a list of species in the genus Corymbia accepted by the Australian Plant Census as at January 2020.

Species

Corymbia abbreviata
Corymbia abergiana
Corymbia aparrerinja
Corymbia arafurica
Corymbia arenaria
Corymbia arnhemensis
Corymbia aspera
Corymbia aureola
Corymbia bella
Corymbia blakei
Corymbia bleeseri
Corymbia bloxsomei
Corymbia brachycarpa
Corymbia bunites
Corymbia cadophora
Corymbia calophylla
Corymbia candida
Corymbia chartacea
Corymbia chippendalei
Corymbia citriodora
Corymbia clandestina
Corymbia clarksoniana
Corymbia clavigera
Corymbia cliftoniana
Corymbia collina
Corymbia confertiflora
Corymbia dallachiana
Corymbia dendromerinx
Corymbia deserticola
Corymbia dichromophloia
Corymbia disjuncta
Corymbia dunlopiana
Corymbia ellipsoidea
Corymbia eremaea
Corymbia erythrophloia
Corymbia eximia
Corymbia ferriticola
Corymbia ferruginea
Corymbia ficifolia
Corymbia flavescens
Corymbia foelscheana
Corymbia gilbertensis
Corymbia grandifolia
Corymbia greeniana
Corymbia gummifera
Corymbia haematoxylon
Corymbia hamersleyana
Corymbia hendersonii
Corymbia henryi
Corymbia hylandii
Corymbia intermedia
Corymbia jacobsiana
Corymbia kombolgiensis
Corymbia lamprophylla
Corymbia latifolia
Corymbia leichhardtii
Corymbia lenziana
Corymbia leptoloma
Corymbia ligans
Corymbia maculata
Corymbia nesophila
Corymbia novoguinensis
Corymbia oocarpa
Corymbia opaca
Corymbia pachycarpa
Corymbia papillosa
Corymbia papuana
Corymbia paractia
Corymbia pauciseta
Corymbia peltata
Corymbia petalophylla
Corymbia plena
Corymbia pocillum
Corymbia polycarpa
Corymbia polysciada
Corymbia porrecta
Corymbia ptychocarpa
Corymbia rhodops
Corymbia scabrida
Corymbia serendipita
Corymbia setosa
Corymbia sphaerica
Corymbia stockeri
Corymbia terminalis
Corymbia tessellaris
Corymbia torelliana
Corymbia torta
Corymbia trachyphloia
Corymbia umbonata
Corymbia watsoniana
Corymbia xanthope
Corymbia zygophylla

See also
Cultivars
 Corymbia 'Summer Red'
Other reading
 List of Eucalyptus species

References

Corymbia